Well is a small estate village and civil parish about  south of the town of Alford, in the East Lindsey district of Lincolnshire, England. The population of the civil parish was 166 at the 2011 census.  It is situated on the foot of the east entry to the Lincolnshire Wolds. The population of 166 as at the 2011 census includes the hamlet of Claxby St. Andrew.  The village provides views of the gradually sloping hills towards the west.

The name 'Well' comes from the Old English word wella meaning 'spring/stream'.

Geography and landmarks

In the village there is a church, telephone box, and post box, and a bus shelter with a CallConnect bus service.

The cricket club in Well serves Alford and the surrounding area; its ground holds cricket matches and summer car boot sales, and Guy Fawkes Night celebrations on 4 and 6 November.

The parish church is dedicated to Saint Margaret, and was built of red brick in 1733 around the same time as Well Vale House. It was altered in the late 18th century, restored in 1959, and is a Grade I listed building. 

Grove House is a Victorian country house surrounded by gardens and built in 1853 of brick, situated on the edge of the Well Hall Park.

Well Hall Park was first laid out in the early 18th century after the damming of Well Beck to create two lakes, and included moving the village of Well to its present site.

The National Heritage List for England calls it Well Vale Park, and describes it as a former red brick country house, now a private school, which is Grade II* listed, dating from the early 17th century, altered about 1730 for James Bateman, and extended in the late 18th century for Francis Dashwood. It was partly destroyed Fire in 1845, and rebuilt in 1925 by Guy Elwes.

Thomas Allen, in his The History of the County of Lincoln, From the Earliest Period to the Present Time, wrote:

References

External links

Villages in Lincolnshire
Civil parishes in Lincolnshire
East Lindsey District